Oxygen is the chemical element with the symbol O and atomic number 8. It is a member of the chalcogen group in the periodic table, a highly reactive nonmetal, and an oxidizing agent that readily forms oxides with most elements as well as with other compounds. Oxygen is Earth's most abundant element, and after hydrogen and helium, it is the third-most abundant element in the universe. At standard temperature and pressure, two atoms of the element bind to form dioxygen, a colorless and odorless diatomic gas with the formula . Diatomic oxygen gas currently constitutes 20.95% of the Earth's atmosphere, though this has changed considerably over long periods of time. Oxygen makes up almost half of the Earth's crust in the form of oxides.

All plants, animals, and fungus need oxygen for cellular respiration, which extracts energy by the reaction of oxygen with molecules derived from food and produces carbon dioxide as a waste product. In tetrapods breathing brings oxygen into the lungs where gas exchange takes place, carbon dioxide diffuses out of the blood, and oxygen diffuses into the blood. The body's circulatory system transports the oxygen the cells, where cellular respiration takes place.

Many major classes of organic molecules in living organisms contain oxygen atoms, such as proteins, nucleic acids, carbohydrates, and fats, as do the major constituent inorganic compounds of animal shells, teeth, and bone. Most of the mass of living organisms is oxygen as a component of water, the major constituent of lifeforms. Oxygen is continuously replenished in Earth's atmosphere by photosynthesis, which uses the energy of sunlight to produce oxygen from water and carbon dioxide. Oxygen is too chemically reactive to remain a free element in air without being continuously replenished by the photosynthetic action of living organisms. Another form (allotrope) of oxygen, ozone, strongly absorbs ultraviolet UVB radiation and the high-altitude ozone layer helps protect the biosphere from ultraviolet radiation. However, ozone present at the surface is a byproduct of smog and thus a pollutant.

Oxygen was isolated by Michael Sendivogius before 1604, but it is commonly believed that the element was discovered independently by Carl Wilhelm Scheele, in Uppsala, in 1773 or earlier, and Joseph Priestley in Wiltshire, in 1774. Priority is often given for Priestley because his work was published first. Priestley, however, called oxygen "dephlogisticated air", and did not recognize it as a chemical element. The name oxygen was coined in 1777 by Antoine Lavoisier, who first recognized oxygen as a chemical element and correctly characterized the role it plays in combustion.

Common uses of oxygen include production of steel, plastics and textiles, brazing, welding and cutting of steels and other metals, rocket propellant, oxygen therapy, and life support systems in aircraft, submarines, spaceflight and diving.

History of study

Early experiments

One of the first known experiments on the relationship between combustion and air was conducted by the 2nd century BCE Greek writer on mechanics, Philo of Byzantium. In his work Pneumatica, Philo observed that inverting a vessel over a burning candle and surrounding the vessel's neck with water resulted in some water rising into the neck. Philo incorrectly surmised that parts of the air in the vessel were converted into the classical element fire and thus were able to escape through pores in the glass. Many centuries later Leonardo da Vinci built on Philo's work by observing that a portion of air is consumed during combustion and respiration.

In the late 17th century, Robert Boyle proved that air is necessary for combustion. English chemist John Mayow (1641–1679) refined this work by showing that fire requires only a part of air that he called spiritus nitroaereus. In one experiment, he found that placing either a mouse or a lit candle in a closed container over water caused the water to rise and replace one-fourteenth of the air's volume before extinguishing the subjects. From this, he surmised that nitroaereus is consumed in both respiration and combustion.

Mayow observed that antimony increased in weight when heated, and inferred that the nitroaereus must have combined with it. He also thought that the lungs separate nitroaereus from air and pass it into the blood and that animal heat and muscle movement result from the reaction of nitroaereus with certain substances in the body. Accounts of these and other experiments and ideas were published in 1668 in his work Tractatus duo in the tract "De respiratione".

Phlogiston theory

Robert Hooke, Ole Borch, Mikhail Lomonosov, and Pierre Bayen all produced oxygen in experiments in the 17th and the 18th century but none of them recognized it as a chemical element. This may have been in part due to the prevalence of the philosophy of combustion and corrosion called the phlogiston theory, which was then the favored explanation of those processes.

Established in 1667 by the German alchemist J. J. Becher, and modified by the chemist Georg Ernst Stahl by 1731, phlogiston theory stated that all combustible materials were made of two parts. One part, called phlogiston, was given off when the substance containing it was burned, while the dephlogisticated part was thought to be its true form, or calx.

Highly combustible materials that leave little residue, such as wood or coal, were thought to be made mostly of phlogiston; non-combustible substances that corrode, such as iron, contained very little. Air did not play a role in phlogiston theory, nor were any initial quantitative experiments conducted to test the idea; instead, it was based on observations of what happens when something burns, that most common objects appear to become lighter and seem to lose something in the process.

Discovery

Polish alchemist, philosopher, and physician Michael Sendivogius (Michał Sędziwój) in his work De Lapide Philosophorum Tractatus duodecim e naturae fonte et manuali experientia depromti (1604) described a substance contained in air, referring to it as 'cibus vitae' (food of life,) and according to Polish historian Roman Bugaj, this substance is identical with oxygen. Sendivogius, during his experiments performed between 1598 and 1604, properly recognized that the substance is equivalent to the gaseous byproduct released by the thermal decomposition of potassium nitrate. In Bugaj's view, the isolation of oxygen and the proper association of the substance to that part of air which is required for life, provides sufficient evidence for the discovery of oxygen by Sendivogius. This discovery of Sendivogius was however frequently denied by the generations of scientists and chemists which succeeded him.

It is also commonly claimed that oxygen was first discovered by Swedish pharmacist Carl Wilhelm Scheele. He had produced oxygen gas by heating mercuric oxide (HgO) and various nitrates in 1771–72. Scheele called the gas "fire air" because it was then the only known agent to support combustion. He wrote an account of this discovery in a manuscript titled Treatise on Air and Fire, which he sent to his publisher in 1775. That document was published in 1777.

In the meantime, on August 1, 1774, an experiment conducted by the British clergyman Joseph Priestley focused sunlight on mercuric oxide contained in a glass tube, which liberated a gas he named "dephlogisticated air". He noted that candles burned brighter in the gas and that a mouse was more active and lived longer while breathing it. After breathing the gas himself, Priestley wrote: "The feeling of it to my lungs was not sensibly different from that of common air, but I fancied that my breast felt peculiarly light and easy for some time afterwards." Priestley published his findings in 1775 in a paper titled "An Account of Further Discoveries in Air", which was included in the second volume of his book titled Experiments and Observations on Different Kinds of Air. Because he published his findings first, Priestley is usually given priority in the discovery.

The French chemist Antoine Laurent Lavoisier later claimed to have discovered the new substance independently. Priestley visited Lavoisier in October 1774 and told him about his experiment and how he liberated the new gas. Scheele had also dispatched a letter to Lavoisier on September 30, 1774, which described his discovery of the previously unknown substance, but Lavoisier never acknowledged receiving it. (A copy of the letter was found in Scheele's belongings after his death.)

Lavoisier's contribution

Lavoisier conducted the first adequate quantitative experiments on oxidation and gave the first correct explanation of how combustion works. He used these and similar experiments, all started in 1774, to discredit the phlogiston theory and to prove that the substance discovered by Priestley and Scheele was a chemical element.

In one experiment, Lavoisier observed that there was no overall increase in weight when tin and air were heated in a closed container. He noted that air rushed in when he opened the container, which indicated that part of the trapped air had been consumed. He also noted that the tin had increased in weight and that increase was the same as the weight of the air that rushed back in. This and other experiments on combustion were documented in his book Sur la combustion en général, which was published in 1777. In that work, he proved that air is a mixture of two gases; 'vital air', which is essential to combustion and respiration, and azote (Gk.  "lifeless"), which did not support either. Azote later became nitrogen in English, although it has kept the earlier name in French and several other European languages.

Etymology

Lavoisier renamed 'vital air' to oxygène in 1777 from the Greek roots  (oxys) (acid, literally "sharp", from the taste of acids) and -γενής (-genēs) (producer, literally begetter), because he mistakenly believed that oxygen was a constituent of all acids. Chemists (such as Sir Humphry Davy in 1812) eventually determined that Lavoisier was wrong in this regard, but by then the name was too well established.

Oxygen entered the English language despite opposition by English scientists and the fact that the Englishman Priestley had first isolated the gas and written about it. This is partly due to a poem praising the gas titled "Oxygen" in the popular book The Botanic Garden (1791) by Erasmus Darwin, grandfather of Charles Darwin.

Later history

John Dalton's original atomic hypothesis presumed that all elements were monatomic and that the atoms in compounds would normally have the simplest atomic ratios with respect to one another. For example, Dalton assumed that water's formula was HO, leading to the conclusion that the atomic mass of oxygen was 8 times that of hydrogen, instead of the modern value of about 16. In 1805, Joseph Louis Gay-Lussac and Alexander von Humboldt showed that water is formed of two volumes of hydrogen and one volume of oxygen; and by 1811 Amedeo Avogadro had arrived at the correct interpretation of water's composition, based on what is now called Avogadro's law and the diatomic elemental molecules in those gases.

The first commercial method of producing oxygen was chemical, the so-called Brin process involving a reversible reaction of barium oxide. It was invented in 1852 and commercialized in 1884, but was displaced by newer methods in early 20th century.

By the late 19th century scientists realized that air could be liquefied and its components isolated by compressing and cooling it. Using a cascade method, Swiss chemist and physicist Raoul Pierre Pictet evaporated liquid sulfur dioxide in order to liquefy carbon dioxide, which in turn was evaporated to cool oxygen gas enough to liquefy it. He sent a telegram on December 22, 1877, to the French Academy of Sciences in Paris announcing his discovery of liquid oxygen. Just two days later, French physicist Louis Paul Cailletet announced his own method of liquefying molecular oxygen. Only a few drops of the liquid were produced in each case and no meaningful analysis could be conducted. Oxygen was liquefied in a stable state for the first time on March 29, 1883, by Polish scientists from Jagiellonian University, Zygmunt Wróblewski and Karol Olszewski.

In 1891 Scottish chemist James Dewar was able to produce enough liquid oxygen for study. The first commercially viable process for producing liquid oxygen was independently developed in 1895 by German engineer Carl von Linde and British engineer William Hampson. Both men lowered the temperature of air until it liquefied and then distilled the component gases by boiling them off one at a time and capturing them separately. Later, in 1901, oxyacetylene welding was demonstrated for the first time by burning a mixture of acetylene and compressed . This method of welding and cutting metal later became common.

In 1923, the American scientist Robert H. Goddard became the first person to develop a rocket engine that burned liquid fuel; the engine used gasoline for fuel and liquid oxygen as the oxidizer. Goddard successfully flew a small liquid-fueled rocket 56 m at 97 km/h on March 16, 1926, in Auburn, Massachusetts, US.

In academic laboratories, oxygen can be prepared by heating together potassium chlorate mixed with a small proportion of manganese dioxide.

Oxygen levels in the atmosphere are trending slightly downward globally, possibly because of fossil-fuel burning.

Characteristics

Properties and molecular structure

At standard temperature and pressure, oxygen is a colorless, odorless, and tasteless gas with the molecular formula , referred to as dioxygen.

As dioxygen, two oxygen atoms are chemically bound to each other. The bond can be variously described based on level of theory, but is reasonably and simply described as a covalent double bond that results from the filling of molecular orbitals formed from the atomic orbitals of the individual oxygen atoms, the filling of which results in a bond order of two. More specifically, the double bond is the result of sequential, low-to-high energy, or Aufbau, filling of orbitals, and the resulting cancellation of contributions from the 2s electrons, after sequential filling of the low σ and σ* orbitals; σ overlap of the two atomic 2p orbitals that lie along the O–O molecular axis and π overlap of two pairs of atomic 2p orbitals perpendicular to the O–O molecular axis, and then cancellation of contributions from the remaining two 2p electrons after their partial filling of the π* orbitals.

This combination of cancellations and σ and π overlaps results in dioxygen's double-bond character and reactivity, and a triplet electronic ground state. An electron configuration with two unpaired electrons, as is found in dioxygen orbitals (see the filled π* orbitals in the diagram) that are of equal energy—i.e., degenerate—is a configuration termed a spin triplet state. Hence, the ground state of the  molecule is referred to as triplet oxygen. The highest-energy, partially filled orbitals are antibonding, and so their filling weakens the bond order from three to two. Because of its unpaired electrons, triplet oxygen reacts only slowly with most organic molecules, which have paired electron spins; this prevents spontaneous combustion.

In the triplet form,  molecules are paramagnetic. That is, they impart magnetic character to oxygen when it is in the presence of a magnetic field, because of the spin magnetic moments of the unpaired electrons in the molecule, and the negative exchange energy between neighboring  molecules. Liquid oxygen is so magnetic that, in laboratory demonstrations, a bridge of liquid oxygen may be supported against its own weight between the poles of a powerful magnet.

Singlet oxygen is a name given to several higher-energy species of molecular  in which all the electron spins are paired. It is much more reactive with common organic molecules than is normal (triplet) molecular oxygen. In nature, singlet oxygen is commonly formed from water during photosynthesis, using the energy of sunlight. It is also produced in the troposphere by the photolysis of ozone by light of short wavelength and by the immune system as a source of active oxygen. Carotenoids in photosynthetic organisms (and possibly animals) play a major role in absorbing energy from singlet oxygen and converting it to the unexcited ground state before it can cause harm to tissues.

Allotropes

The common allotrope of elemental oxygen on Earth is called dioxygen, the major part of the Earth's atmospheric oxygen (see Occurrence). O2 has a bond length of 121 pm and a bond energy of 498 kJ/mol. O2 is used by complex forms of life, such as animals, in cellular respiration.

Trioxygen is usually known as ozone and is a very reactive allotrope of oxygen that is damaging to lung tissue. Since ozone absorbs strongly in the UV region of the spectrum, the ozone layer of the upper atmosphere functions as a protective radiation shield for the planet. Near the Earth's surface, it is a pollutant formed as a by-product of automobile exhaust. At low earth orbit altitudes, sufficient atomic oxygen is present to cause corrosion of spacecraft.

The metastable molecule tetraoxygen was discovered in 2001, and was assumed to exist in one of the six phases of solid oxygen. It was proven in 2006 that this phase, created by pressurizing  to 20 GPa, is in fact a rhombohedral  cluster. A metallic phase was discovered in 1990 when solid oxygen is subjected to a pressure of above 96 GPa and it was shown in 1998 that at very low temperatures, this phase becomes superconducting.

Physical properties

Oxygen dissolves more readily in water than in nitrogen, and in freshwater more readily than in seawater. At 5 °C the solubility increases to 9.0 mL (50% more than at 25 °C) per liter for freshwater and 7.2 mL (45% more) per liter for sea water.

Oxygen condenses at 90.20 K (−182.95 °C, −297.31 °F) and freezes at 54.36 K (−218.79 °C, −361.82 °F). Both liquid and solid  are clear substances with a light sky-blue color caused by absorption in the red (in contrast with the blue color of the sky, which is due to Rayleigh scattering of blue light). High-purity liquid  is usually obtained by the fractional distillation of liquefied air. Liquid oxygen may also be condensed from air using liquid nitrogen as a coolant.

Liquid oxygen is a highly reactive substance and must be segregated from combustible materials.

The spectroscopy of molecular oxygen is associated with the atmospheric processes of aurora and airglow. The absorption in the Herzberg continuum and Schumann–Runge bands in the ultraviolet produces atomic oxygen that is important in the chemistry of the middle atmosphere. Excited-state singlet molecular oxygen is responsible for red chemiluminescence in solution.

Table of thermal and physical properties of oxygen (O2) at atmospheric pressure:

Isotopes and stellar origin

Naturally occurring oxygen is composed of three stable isotopes, 16O, 17O, and 18O, with 16O being the most abundant (99.762% natural abundance).

Most 16O is synthesized at the end of the helium fusion process in massive stars but some is made in the neon burning process. 17O is primarily made by the burning of hydrogen into helium during the CNO cycle, making it a common isotope in the hydrogen burning zones of stars. Most 18O is produced when 14N (made abundant from CNO burning) captures a 4He nucleus, making 18O common in the helium-rich zones of evolved, massive stars.

Thirteen radioisotopes have been characterized, ranging from 11O to 26O. The most stable are 15O with a half-life of 122.24 seconds and 14O with a half-life of 70.606 seconds. All of the remaining radioactive isotopes have half-lives that are less than 27 s and the majority of these have half-lives that are less than 83 milliseconds. The most common decay mode of the isotopes lighter than 16O is β+ decay to yield nitrogen, and the most common mode for the isotopes heavier than 18O is beta decay to yield fluorine.

Occurrence

Oxygen is the most abundant chemical element by mass in the Earth's biosphere, air, sea and land. Oxygen is the third most abundant chemical element in the universe, after hydrogen and helium. About 0.9% of the Sun's mass is oxygen. Oxygen constitutes 49.2% of the Earth's crust by mass as part of oxide compounds such as silicon dioxide and is the most abundant element by mass in the Earth's crust. It is also the major component of the world's oceans (88.8% by mass). Oxygen gas is the second most common component of the Earth's atmosphere, taking up 20.8% of its volume and 23.1% of its mass (some 1015 tonnes). Earth is unusual among the planets of the Solar System in having such a high concentration of oxygen gas in its atmosphere: Mars (with 0.1%  by volume) and Venus have much less. The  surrounding those planets is produced solely by the action of ultraviolet radiation on oxygen-containing molecules such as carbon dioxide.

The unusually high concentration of oxygen gas on Earth is the result of the oxygen cycle. This biogeochemical cycle describes the movement of oxygen within and between its three main reservoirs on Earth: the atmosphere, the biosphere, and the lithosphere. The main driving factor of the oxygen cycle is photosynthesis, which is responsible for modern Earth's atmosphere. Photosynthesis releases oxygen into the atmosphere, while respiration, decay, and combustion remove it from the atmosphere. In the present equilibrium, production and consumption occur at the same rate.

Free oxygen also occurs in solution in the world's water bodies. Water polluted with plant nutrients such as nitrates or phosphates may stimulate growth of algae by a process called eutrophication and the decay of these organisms and other biomaterials may reduce the  content in eutrophic water bodies. Scientists assess this aspect of water quality by measuring the water's biochemical oxygen demand, or the amount of  needed to restore it to a normal concentration.

Analysis

Paleoclimatologists measure the ratio of oxygen-18 and oxygen-16 in the shells and skeletons of marine organisms to determine the climate millions of years ago (see oxygen isotope ratio cycle). Seawater molecules that contain the lighter isotope, oxygen-16, evaporate at a slightly faster rate than water molecules containing the 12% heavier oxygen-18, and this disparity increases at lower temperatures. During periods of lower global temperatures, snow and rain from that evaporated water tends to be higher in oxygen-16, and the seawater left behind tends to be higher in oxygen-18. Marine organisms then incorporate more oxygen-18 into their skeletons and shells than they would in a warmer climate. Paleoclimatologists also directly measure this ratio in the water molecules of ice core samples as old as hundreds of thousands of years.

Planetary geologists have measured the relative quantities of oxygen isotopes in samples from the Earth, the Moon, Mars, and meteorites, but were long unable to obtain reference values for the isotope ratios in the Sun, believed to be the same as those of the primordial solar nebula. Analysis of a silicon wafer exposed to the solar wind in space and returned by the crashed Genesis spacecraft has shown that the Sun has a higher proportion of oxygen-16 than does the Earth. The measurement implies that an unknown process depleted oxygen-16 from the Sun's disk of protoplanetary material prior to the coalescence of dust grains that formed the Earth.

Oxygen presents two spectrophotometric absorption bands peaking at the wavelengths 687 and 760 nm. Some remote sensing scientists have proposed using the measurement of the radiance coming from vegetation canopies in those bands to characterize plant health status from a satellite platform. This approach exploits the fact that in those bands it is possible to discriminate the vegetation's reflectance from its fluorescence, which is much weaker. The measurement is technically difficult owing to the low signal-to-noise ratio and the physical structure of vegetation; but it has been proposed as a possible method of monitoring the carbon cycle from satellites on a global scale.

Biological production and role of O2

Photosynthesis and respiration

In nature, free oxygen is produced by the light-driven splitting of water during oxygenic photosynthesis. According to some estimates, green algae and cyanobacteria in marine environments provide about 70% of the free oxygen produced on Earth, and the rest is produced by terrestrial plants. Other estimates of the oceanic contribution to atmospheric oxygen are higher, while some estimates are lower, suggesting oceans produce ~45% of Earth's atmospheric oxygen each year.

A simplified overall formula for photosynthesis is

 6  + 6  + photons →  + 6 

or simply

 carbon dioxide + water + sunlight → glucose + dioxygen

Photolytic oxygen evolution occurs in the thylakoid membranes of photosynthetic organisms and requires the energy of four photons. Many steps are involved, but the result is the formation of a proton gradient across the thylakoid membrane, which is used to synthesize adenosine triphosphate (ATP) via photophosphorylation. The  remaining (after production of the water molecule) is released into the atmosphere.

Oxygen is used in mitochondria in the generation of ATP during oxidative phosphorylation. The reaction for aerobic respiration is essentially the reverse of photosynthesis and is simplified as

  + 6  → 6  + 6  + 2880 kJ/mol

In vertebrates,  diffuses through membranes in the lungs and into red blood cells. Hemoglobin binds , changing color from bluish red to bright red ( is released from another part of hemoglobin through the Bohr effect). Other animals use hemocyanin (molluscs and some arthropods) or hemerythrin (spiders and lobsters).

Until the discovery of anaerobic metazoa, oxygen was thought to be a requirement for all complex life.

Reactive oxygen species, such as superoxide ion and hydrogen peroxide, are reactive by-products of oxygen use in organisms. Parts of the immune system of higher organisms create peroxide, superoxide, and singlet oxygen to destroy invading microbes. Reactive oxygen species also play an important role in the hypersensitive response of plants against pathogen attack. Oxygen is damaging to obligately anaerobic organisms, which were the dominant form of early life on Earth until  began to accumulate in the atmosphere about 2.5 billion years ago during the Great Oxygenation Event, about a billion years after the first appearance of these organisms.

An adult human at rest inhales 1.8 to 2.4 grams of oxygen per minute. This amounts to more than 6 billion tonnes of oxygen inhaled by humanity per year.

Living organisms

The free oxygen partial pressure in the body of a living vertebrate organism is highest in the respiratory system, and decreases along any arterial system, peripheral tissues, and venous system, respectively. Partial pressure is the pressure that oxygen would have if it alone occupied the volume.

Build-up in the atmosphere

Free oxygen gas was almost nonexistent in Earth's atmosphere before photosynthetic archaea and bacteria evolved, probably about 3.5 billion years ago. Free oxygen first appeared in significant quantities during the Paleoproterozoic eon (between 3.0 and 2.3 billion years ago). Even if there was much dissolved iron in the oceans when oxygenic photosynthesis was getting more common, it appears the banded iron formations were created by anoxyenic or micro-aerophilic iron-oxidizing bacteria which dominated the deeper areas of the photic zone, while oxygen-producing cyanobacteria covered the shallows. Free oxygen began to outgas from the oceans 3–2.7 billion years ago, reaching 10% of its present level around 1.7 billion years ago.

The presence of large amounts of dissolved and free oxygen in the oceans and atmosphere may have driven most of the extant anaerobic organisms to extinction during the Great Oxygenation Event (oxygen catastrophe) about 2.4 billion years ago. Cellular respiration using  enables aerobic organisms to produce much more ATP than anaerobic organisms. Cellular respiration of  occurs in all eukaryotes, including all complex multicellular organisms such as plants and animals.

Since the beginning of the Cambrian period 540 million years ago, atmospheric  levels have fluctuated between 15% and 30% by volume. Towards the end of the Carboniferous period (about 300 million years ago) atmospheric  levels reached a maximum of 35% by volume, which may have contributed to the large size of insects and amphibians at this time.

Variations in atmospheric oxygen concentration have shaped past climates. When oxygen declined, atmospheric density dropped, which in turn increased surface evaporation, causing precipitation increases and warmer temperatures.

At the current rate of photosynthesis it would take about 2,000 years to regenerate the entire  in the present atmosphere.

Extraterrestrial free oxygen

In the field of astrobiology and in the search for extraterrestrial life oxygen is a strong biosignature. That said it might not be a definite biosignature, being possibly produced abiotically on celestial bodies with processes and conditions (such as a peculiar hydrosphere) which allow free oxygen, like with Europa's and Ganymede's thin
oxygen atmospheres.

Industrial production

The most common method is fractional distillation of liquefied air, with  distilling as a vapor while  is left as a liquid.

The other primary method of producing  is passing a stream of clean, dry air through one bed of a pair of identical zeolite molecular sieves, which absorbs the nitrogen and delivers a gas stream that is 90% to 93% . Simultaneously, nitrogen gas is released from the other nitrogen-saturated zeolite bed, by reducing the chamber operating pressure and diverting part of the oxygen gas from the producer bed through it, in the reverse direction of flow. After a set cycle time the operation of the two beds is interchanged, thereby allowing for a continuous supply of gaseous oxygen to be pumped through a pipeline. This is known as pressure swing adsorption. Oxygen gas is increasingly obtained by these non-cryogenic technologies (see also the related vacuum swing adsorption).

Oxygen gas can also be produced through electrolysis of water into molecular oxygen and hydrogen. DC electricity must be used: if AC is used, the gases in each limb consist of hydrogen and oxygen in the explosive ratio 2:1. A similar method is the electrocatalytic  evolution from oxides and oxoacids. Chemical catalysts can be used as well, such as in chemical oxygen generators or oxygen candles that are used as part of the life-support equipment on submarines, and are still part of standard equipment on commercial airliners in case of depressurization emergencies. Another air separation method is forcing air to dissolve through ceramic membranes based on zirconium dioxide by either high pressure or an electric current, to produce nearly pure  gas.

Storage 

Oxygen storage methods include high-pressure oxygen tanks, cryogenics and chemical compounds. Such tankers are used to refill bulk liquid-oxygen storage containers, which stand outside hospitals and other institutions that need large volumes of pure oxygen gas. Liquid oxygen is passed through heat exchangers, which convert the cryogenic liquid into gas before it enters the building. Oxygen is also stored and shipped in smaller cylinders containing the compressed gas; a form that is useful in certain portable medical applications and oxy-fuel welding and cutting.

Applications

Medical

Treatment not only increases oxygen levels in the patient's blood, but has the secondary effect of decreasing resistance to blood flow in many types of diseased lungs, easing work load on the heart. Oxygen therapy is used to treat emphysema, pneumonia, some heart disorders (congestive heart failure), some disorders that cause increased pulmonary artery pressure, and any disease that impairs the body's ability to take up and use gaseous oxygen.

Treatments are flexible enough to be used in hospitals, the patient's home, or increasingly by portable devices. Oxygen tents were once commonly used in oxygen supplementation, but have since been replaced mostly by the use of oxygen masks or nasal cannulas.

Hyperbaric (high-pressure) medicine uses special oxygen chambers to increase the partial pressure of  around the patient and, when needed, the medical staff. Carbon monoxide poisoning, gas gangrene, and decompression sickness (the 'bends') are sometimes addressed with this therapy. Increased  concentration in the lungs helps to displace carbon monoxide from the heme group of hemoglobin. Oxygen gas is poisonous to the anaerobic bacteria that cause gas gangrene, so increasing its partial pressure helps kill them. Decompression sickness occurs in divers who decompress too quickly after a dive, resulting in bubbles of inert gas, mostly nitrogen and helium, forming in the blood. Normobaric oxygen administration at the highest available concentration is frequently used as first aid for any diving injury that may involve inert gas bubble formation in the tissues. There is epidemiological support for its use from a statistical study of cases recorded in a long term database.

Life support and recreational use

This trade-off of higher oxygen concentration for lower pressure is needed to maintain suit flexibility.

Scuba and surface-supplied underwater divers and submariners also rely on artificially delivered . Submarines, submersibles and atmospheric diving suits usually operate at normal atmospheric pressure. Breathing air is scrubbed of carbon dioxide by chemical extraction and oxygen is replaced to maintain a constant partial pressure. Ambient pressure divers breathe air or gas mixtures with an oxygen fraction suited to the operating depth. Pure or nearly pure  use in diving at pressures higher than atmospheric is usually limited to rebreathers, or decompression at relatively shallow depths (~6 meters depth, or less), or medical treatment in recompression chambers at pressures up to 2.8 bar, where acute oxygen toxicity can be managed without the risk of drowning.

People who climb mountains or fly in non-pressurized fixed-wing aircraft sometimes have supplemental  supplies. Pressurized commercial airplanes have an emergency supply of  automatically supplied to the passengers in case of cabin depressurization. Sudden cabin pressure loss activates chemical oxygen generators above each seat, causing oxygen masks to drop. Pulling on the masks "to start the flow of oxygen" as cabin safety instructions dictate, forces iron filings into the sodium chlorate inside the canister. A steady stream of oxygen gas is then produced by the exothermic reaction.

Oxygen, as a mild euphoric, has a history of recreational use in oxygen bars and in sports. Oxygen bars are establishments found in the United States since the late 1990s that offer higher than normal  exposure for a minimal fee. Professional athletes, especially in American football, sometimes go off-field between plays to don oxygen masks to boost performance. The pharmacological effect is doubted; a placebo effect is a more likely explanation. Available studies support a performance boost from oxygen enriched mixtures only if it is inhaled during aerobic exercise.

Other recreational uses that do not involve breathing include pyrotechnic applications, such as George Goble's five-second ignition of barbecue grills.

Industrial

Smelting of iron ore into steel consumes 55% of commercially produced oxygen. The reactions are exothermic, so the temperature increases to 1,700 °C.

Another 25% of commercially produced oxygen is used by the chemical industry.

Most of the remaining 20% of commercially produced oxygen is used in medical applications, metal cutting and welding, as an oxidizer in rocket fuel, and in water treatment.

Compounds

The oxidation state of oxygen is −2 in almost all known compounds of oxygen. The oxidation state −1 is found in a few compounds such as peroxides. Compounds containing oxygen in other oxidation states are very uncommon: −1/2 (superoxides), −1/3 (ozonides), 0 (elemental, hypofluorous acid), +1/2 (dioxygenyl), +1 (dioxygen difluoride), and +2 (oxygen difluoride).

Oxides and other inorganic compounds

Water is an oxide of hydrogen and the most familiar oxygen compound. Hydrogen atoms are covalently bonded to oxygen in a water molecule but also have an additional attraction (about 23.3 kJ/mol per hydrogen atom) to an adjacent oxygen atom in a separate molecule. These hydrogen bonds between water molecules hold them approximately 15% closer than what would be expected in a simple liquid with just van der Waals forces.

Due to its electronegativity, oxygen forms chemical bonds with almost all other elements to give corresponding oxides. The surface of most metals, such as aluminium and titanium, are oxidized in the presence of air and become coated with a thin film of oxide that passivates the metal and slows further corrosion. Many oxides of the transition metals are non-stoichiometric compounds, with slightly less metal than the chemical formula would show.

Oxygen is present in the atmosphere in trace quantities in the form of carbon dioxide. The Earth's crustal rock is composed in large part of oxides of silicon (silica , as found in granite and quartz), aluminium (aluminium oxide , in bauxite and corundum), iron (iron(III) oxide , in hematite and rust), and calcium carbonate (in limestone). The rest of the Earth's crust is also made of oxygen compounds, in particular various complex silicates (in silicate minerals). The Earth's mantle, of much larger mass than the crust, is largely composed of silicates of magnesium and iron.

Oxygen also acts as a ligand for transition metals, forming transition metal dioxygen complexes, which feature metal–. This class of compounds includes the heme proteins hemoglobin and myoglobin.

Organic compounds

Among the most important classes of organic compounds that contain oxygen are (where "R" is an organic group): alcohols (R-OH); ethers (R-O-R); ketones (R-CO-R); aldehydes (R-CO-H); carboxylic acids (R-COOH); esters (R-COO-R); acid anhydrides (R-CO-O-CO-R); and amides. There are many important organic solvents that contain oxygen, including: acetone, methanol, ethanol, isopropanol, furan, THF, diethyl ether, dioxane, ethyl acetate, DMF, DMSO, acetic acid, and formic acid. Acetone and phenol are used as feeder materials in the synthesis of many different substances. Other important organic compounds that contain oxygen are: glycerol, formaldehyde, glutaraldehyde, citric acid, acetic anhydride, and acetamide. Epoxides are ethers in which the oxygen atom is part of a ring of three atoms. The element is similarly found in almost all biomolecules that are important to (or generated by) life.

Oxygen reacts spontaneously with many organic compounds at or below room temperature in a process called autoxidation. Organic compounds important in industry and commerce that are made by direct oxidation of a precursor include ethylene oxide and peracetic acid.

Safety and precautions

The NFPA 704 standard rates compressed oxygen gas as nonhazardous to health, nonflammable and nonreactive, but an oxidizer. Refrigerated liquid oxygen (LOX) is given a health hazard rating of 3 (for increased risk of hyperoxia from condensed vapors, and for hazards common to cryogenic liquids such as frostbite), and all other ratings are the same as the compressed gas form.

Toxicity

Oxygen gas can be toxic at elevated partial pressures, leading to convulsions and other health problems. Oxygen toxicity usually begins to occur at partial pressures more than 50 kilopascals (kPa), equal to about 50% oxygen composition at standard pressure or 2.5 times the normal sea-level  partial pressure of about 21 kPa. This is not a problem except for patients on mechanical ventilators, since gas supplied through oxygen masks in medical applications is typically composed of only 30–50%  by volume (about 30 kPa at standard pressure).

At one time, premature babies were placed in incubators containing -rich air, but this practice was discontinued after some babies were blinded by the oxygen content being too high.

Breathing pure  in space applications, such as in some modern space suits, or in early spacecraft such as Apollo, causes no damage due to the low total pressures used. In the case of spacesuits, the  partial pressure in the breathing gas is, in general, about 30 kPa (1.4 times normal), and the resulting  partial pressure in the astronaut's arterial blood is only marginally more than normal sea-level  partial pressure.

Oxygen toxicity to the lungs and central nervous system can also occur in deep scuba diving and surface supplied diving. Prolonged breathing of an air mixture with an  partial pressure more than 60 kPa can eventually lead to permanent pulmonary fibrosis. Exposure to an  partial pressures greater than 160 kPa (about 1.6 atm) may lead to convulsions (normally fatal for divers).

Combustion and other hazards

Highly concentrated sources of oxygen promote rapid combustion. Fire and explosion hazards exist when concentrated oxidants and fuels are brought into close proximity; an ignition event, such as heat or a spark, is needed to trigger combustion. Oxygen is the oxidant, not the fuel.

Concentrated  will allow combustion to proceed rapidly and energetically. Steel pipes and storage vessels used to store and transmit both gaseous and liquid oxygen will act as a fuel; and therefore the design and manufacture of  systems requires special training to ensure that ignition sources are minimized. The fire that killed the Apollo 1 crew in a launch pad test spread so rapidly because the capsule was pressurized with pure  but at slightly more than atmospheric pressure, instead of the  normal pressure that would be used in a mission.

Liquid oxygen spills, if allowed to soak into organic matter, such as wood, petrochemicals, and asphalt can cause these materials to detonate unpredictably on subsequent mechanical impact.

See also

 Geological history of oxygen
 Hypoxia (environmental) for  depletion in aquatic ecology
 Ocean deoxygenation
 Hypoxia (medical), a lack of oxygen
 Limiting oxygen concentration
 Oxygen compounds
 Oxygen plant
 Oxygen sensor

Notes

References

General references

External links

 Oxygen at The Periodic Table of Videos (University of Nottingham)
 Oxidizing Agents > Oxygen
 Oxygen (O2) Properties, Uses, Applications
 Roald Hoffmann article on "The Story of O"
 WebElements.com – Oxygen
 
 Scripps Institute: Atmospheric Oxygen has been dropping for 20 years

 
Chemical elements
Diatomic nonmetals
Reactive nonmetals
Chalcogens
Chemical substances for emergency medicine
Breathing gases
E-number additives
Oxidizing agents